Mammoth Film Festival (or "MammothFF") is an international, five-day event founded in 2018 by Tanner Beard (CEO) and Tomik Mansoori. The festival showcases the work of independent filmmakers, actors, directors, writers, and producers. It is held every February at various venues throughout Mammoth Mountain and the town of Mammoth Lakes, CA.

Festival events include world-premiere feature films and television episodics, short format stories, and other digital-format programming. Other annual highlights are interactive panel discussions, vendor exhibits, and a celebrity bowling tournament for charity.

History

2018
The inaugural Mammoth Film Festival was held February 8–11, 2018, and included:
 Sun Dogs, which won the Grand Jury Prize and the awards for Best Picture, Best Director (Jennifer Morrison) and Best Actor (Michael Angarano) 
 Red Hat's Open Source Stories documentary film Road to A.I.

2019
The 2nd Annual Mammoth Film Festival was held February 7–11, 2019 and debuted:
 James Lafferty and Stephen Colletti's original comedy series Everyone Is Doing Great

2020

The 3rd Annual Mammoth Film Festival was held February 27 to March 2, 2020 and premiered:
 Ludvig Gür's documentary Pretending I'm A Superman: The Tony Hawk Video Game Story
 Quentin Tarantino's documentary QT8: The First Eight (with added footage)
 Zac Efron's Off The Grid destination series featuring the town of Mammoth Lakes
 Indie film Runt starring Cameron Boyce

2021
In late 2020, due to the COVID-19 pandemic, founders Beard and Mansoori decided to delay the 2021 festival until 2022. They felt strongly about maintaining the in-person aspect of the festival, as opposed to making it a virtual or hybrid event.

2022
As of August 2021, the 4th Annual Mammoth Film Festival is scheduled to be held February 3–7, 2022.

Awards

2020
Achievement in Filmmaking -- Lukas Haas' She’s In My Head
Achievement in Filmmaking International -- About Us
Achievement in Filmmaking Music -- Hour Of Lead
Achievement in Filmmaking Cinematography -- Dante Spinotti - Now Is Everything
Achievement in Filmmaking Writer -- William Day Frank - Susie Searches
Achievement in Filmmaking Director -- William Coakley - Runt
Best TV Episodic -- That One Time
Best Genre Film (Short) -- Pleasant Canyon
Best Genre Film (Feature) -- Deported
Best Action Sports (Short) -- Rio Pangagonicos
Best Action Sports (Feature) -- Pretending I’m a Superman: The Tony Hawk Video Game Story
Audience Award (Short) -- Adult Night
Audience Award (Feature) -- Runt
Best Documentary (Short) -- The Return
Best Documentary (Feature) -- Pretending I’m a Superman: The Tony Hawk Video Game Story
Grand Jury Award (Short) -- Clarity
Grand Jury Award (Feature) --  In Full Bloom
Best Actress (Short) -- Joselyn Gallardo
Best Actress (Feature) -- Jules Willcox
Best Actor (Short) -- Brett Zimmerman
Best Actor (Feature) -- Marc Manchecka
Best Picture (Short) --40 Minutes Over Maui
Best Picture (Feature) -- Alone
Festival Favorite -- Hour Of Lead

References

External links
Official site
YouTube
Instagram

Film festivals in California
Film festivals established in 2007
Tourist attractions in Mono County, California